A  is a hall or place for immersive learning, experiential learning or meditation. This is traditionally in the field of martial arts, but has been seen increasingly in other fields, such as meditation and software development.  The term literally means "place of the Way" in Japanese.

History 

The word dōjō originates from Buddhism. Initially, dōjō were adjunct to temples and were formal training places for any of the Japanese arts ending in "-dō", from the Chinese Tao (or Dao), meaning "way" or "path". Sometimes meditation halls where Zen Buddhists practice zazen meditation were called dōjō. The alternative term zen-do is more specific, and more widely used.  European Sōtō Zen groups affiliated with the International Zen Association prefer to use dōjō instead of zendo to describe their meditation halls as did their founding master, Taisen Deshimaru.

In Japan, any facility for physical training, including professional wrestling, may be called a dōjō. In the Western world, the term dōjō (when related to physical activity) is used exclusively for Japanese martial arts such as aikidō, jūdō, karate-dō, etc.

In martial arts 

A proper Japanese martial arts dōjō is considered special and is well cared for by its users. Shoes are not worn in a dōjō. In many styles it is traditional to conduct a ritual cleaning (sōji; 掃除) of the dōjō at the beginning and/or end of each training session. Besides the obvious hygienic benefits of regular cleaning it also serves to reinforce the fact that dōjō are supposed to be supported and managed by the student body (or by special students, e.g., uchi-deshi), not the school's instructional staff. This attitude has become lost in many modern dōjō that are founded and run by a small group of people or instructors. In fact, it is not uncommon that in traditional schools (koryu), dōjō are rarely used for training at all, instead being reserved for more symbolic or formal occasions. The actual training is conducted typically outdoors or in a less formal area.

Many traditional dōjō follow a prescribed pattern with shomen (正面; "front") and various entrances that are used based on student and instructor rank laid out precisely.  Typically students will enter in the lower-left corner of the dōjō (in reference to the shomen) with instructors in the upper right corner. Shomen typically contains a Shintō shrine with a sculpture, flower arrangement, or other artifacts. The term kamiza means "place of honor" and a related term, kamidana refers to the shrine itself. Other artifacts may be displayed throughout the dōjō, such as kanban (看板; signboard) that authorize the school in a style or strategy, and items such as taiko drums or armor (Ō-yoroi). It is not uncommon to find the name of the dōjō and the dōjō kun (roughly "dōjō rules") displayed prominently at shomen as well.  Visitors may have a special place reserved, depending on their rank and station. Weapons and other training gear will normally be found on the back wall.

Honbu dōjō
A honbu dōjō (本部道場) is the central training facility and administrative headquarters of a particular martial arts style.

Some well-known dōjō located in Japan are:
 Kodokan Judo Institute (Judo)
 Aikikai Hombu Dōjō (Aikido)
 Noma Dōjō (Kendo)
 Nakazato Karate Weapons Gym (Shōrin-ryū Shōrinkan)

Other names for training halls
Other names for training halls that are equivalent to "dōjō" include the following:

 Akhara (Indian martial arts)
 Dojang (Korean martial arts)
 Gelanggang (silat Melayu)
 Heya (sumo)
 Kalari (kalaripayat)
 Sasaran (pencak silat)
 Wuguan (wushu)
 Võ Đường (Viet vo dao)

In other fields 
The term dōjō is also increasingly used for other forms of immersive-learning space.

Zen Buddhism
The term dōjō is sometimes used to describe the meditation halls where Zen Buddhists practice zazen seated meditation. The alternative term zen-do is more specific, and more widely used.  European Sōtō Zen groups affiliated with the International Zen Association prefer to use dōjō instead of zendo to describe their meditation halls as did their founding master, Taisen Deshimaru.

Computer-related 
 Coding dōjō: a space and associated technique for groups to practice computer programming skills
 Testing dōjō: a space and time where testers work together on a testing challenge
 Agile coaching dōjō: a space where a cross-functional team works for up to three months, surrounded by an agile coach and technical subject matter experts, to learn and practice agile and technical practices

Notes

References

External links 
 

 
Architecture in Japan
Japanese martial arts terminology
Zen